Moo & Oink was a Chicago, Illinois-based meat company and wholesaler that started at 35th and Calumet Avenue by Joe Lezak around the 1930s. Barry joined Joe, Harvey Lezak and Elliott Levy in 1972 and Barry Lezak joined in 1973.  The company came alive as the 7th generation took over and it was the start of Barry Levy's Storybook Career.  He traced the family's roots back to 1856 in Russia. There were many relatives that went into the meat business from that family. Calumet was started by a 4th Generation family member. They sold different southern games back then as well as pork, chicken, beef, and lamb. They specialized in soul food restaurants and BBQs.  It outgrew the 35th location and moved to 3831 S. Halsted in the 1960s. 

They were mostly serving BBQs and Soul Food Restaurants back then, but the younger generation loved the face-to-face contact with the retail customers. "I love a crowd" was often heard by customers on busy days.  As the wholesale was growing, the newly started retail was taking off with a marketing plan that was completely "out of the box". It was about 1976 the company ordered the mascots Moo & Oink and the company went into orbit. Anyone that saw or heard about the mascots Moo & Oink immediately referred to Calumet as Moo & Oink.

At Calumet's first Bud Billiken Parade in the pre-mascot era, employees held signs that said "clap for catfish, "whistle for ribs", "scream for chicken wings" and more. After the parade, the advertising manager's secretary Lillian Bassett started a poem with the signs included.  They worked on it and turned it over to DJ, businessman, a commercial editor, and more, the late Richard Pegue.  About 5 months later he returned with a finished version of a commercial "looped" for the next Bud Billiken Parade.  

(Update: today it's January, 2022, about 40 years after Richard delivered our jingle I had a message from Pierre b Johnson, the former lead vocalist for 21st Century that he was the voice of our popular jingle.  It was a nice surprise and answers the question I've heard many times over the years, "who sang the commercial?")

It was one of the early Rap commercials for a business. When the Moo & Oink float first went down Dr. Martin Luther King Blvd you could hear folks singing the jingle as it was printed in a holiday weekend issue of the Daily Defender. After the parade, the jingle was made into a donut and played 52 weeks a year on 6 radio stations and 5 TV stations - mainly WGN, WLS, and WPWR. By the 3rd year, the jingle was used in the Bud Billiken Parade, 500,000 people on the left side of the street and 500,000 people on the right side of the street sang along with the four 6-foot tall speakers Richard Pegue set up on the Moo & Oink float. It was an amazing show of love by the company that would do anything for their customers and the customer's appreciation for the company.

It's many promotional events and ad campaigns also made it a favorite shopping destination for many. An order sheet with a list of products sold under the headings "Moo, Oink, Bah, Gobble Gooble, and side orders" helped  the business sales sky rocket! Passed out in high rises up and down State Street in the morning of food stamp days built the business so fast, help was hired from shoppers waiting to be served.  Promotions like The 60-Second Shopping Spree, 50 lbs. of food for $9.50 (WJPC's number on AM radio), free breakfasts, at restaurants while DJs broadcast their show, and the biggest promotion of all, a free concert at the Old Band Shell where police estimated a crowd of "150,000 people with no fights or arrests" spread their customer base here, there, everywhere.  It's late-night television commercials played through the late 1970s until the early 2000s.  In 2004, they had a contest for a new "Rap" commercial. There was a winner, but after 25 years the company stuck with their popular commercial.

As mentioned above, Moo & Oink were used until 2004 when an ad campaign asking listeners to send in a new Rap commercial went on air for 12 weeks.  There were weekly winners and the 10 weekly winners competed in a Final showdown with BBQ for hundreds, as the entrees sang their raps. It was at the Hazel Crest store and a grand time was had by all. A good time was had by all, however, the company decided to stick with the original jingle. In 2005, there was a 12-week ad campaign that starred a Super Hero, the POWER MAN! That lasted 12 weeks. The characters did not talk until about 2004 or 2005, but they danced and made friends with kids and grownups from the very first time they were seen by the public.  At one time there were 4 sets of Moo & Oink costumes and all could be around the 4 Moo & Oink stores at block parties, church affairs, and many more community events.

The 60-second radio commercials used a donut (15 seconds of jingle at open, a number of items on sale, and then 15 seconds of jingle at close) started with an attention-getting "Moo and Oink! Moo Moo Moo!" and eventually ends with a well-known sign-off "Moooooooooooooo 'n' Oink!".  In 2005, Tina Fey and Amy Poehler sang the opening verse of the Moo and Oink jingle on the "Weekend Update" portion of Saturday Night Live in order to prove to Scott Podsednik that they were native Chicago White Sox fans.

In 1975 USDA Prime Beef was sold in the counter to the surprise of Moo & Oink customers and employees. It was just one of the reasons their popularity grew so fast.  In 2006, before changing management, over 175 truckloads of Rib Tips were sold to wholesale and retail customers. Millions of pounds of chitlings were sold in various containers: 40 lb. pails, 30 lb. boxes, 10 lb. pails, loose bags, and their specialty, 4.5 lb bags of hand-cleaned chitlings. More Hot links than they could keep track of both hot and mild, beef, pork, and turkey. Chicken Tenders galore, and load after load of french fries.  
Moo & Oink's popularity grew and grew over the years as their policy was to never lose a customer, not one! There were many products that Moo & Oink branded from the 1980s until October 2006.  Day-to-day management changed hands in October 2006 and the business was soon headed downhill.  In April 2010, the remaining owners revealed a new company logo with updated art of the cow and pig characters.

All Moo & Oink stores closed in 2011, after the company went into Chapter 7 bankruptcy, though there was interest in buying and resurrecting the company. By the end of the year, the brand and trademark were sold to Best Chicago Meat. The stores remained unsold.

See also
Celozzi-Ettleson Chevrolet
Eagle Insurance
Empire Today
Victory Auto Wreckers
Peter Francis Geraci
Walter E. Smithe

References

External links
Official website
Moo and Oink Dance commercial

Defunct companies based in Chicago
Cuisine of Chicago
Fictional cattle
Fictional pigs
Fictional duos